Theodore Gordon (September 18, 1854 – May 1, 1915) was an American writer who fished the Catskill region of New York State in the late 19th century through the early 20th century. Though he never published a book, Gordon is often called the "father of the American school of dry fly fishing". He wrote numerous articles for the Fishing Gazette from 1890 and published works in Forest and Stream from 1903, sometimes under the pseudonym Badger Hackle.

Biography
Theodore Gordon was born in Pittsburgh, Pennsylvania on September 18, 1854.

Gordon had imported English fly-fishing tackle and flies. He altered the English flies to precisely match the insects hatching in the Neversink and Beaverkill rivers, and Willowemoc Creek. Later he made his own flies from scratch. 

Gordon taught himself to tie flies by studying The American Angler's Book (1864) by Thaddeus Norris. He also read British fly fishing literature of the time and corresponded with notable British fly anglers Frederic M. Halford and G. E. M. Skues to perfect his fly tying skills.

Known as a consumptive hermit, Gordon lived his final years and died on May 1, 1915 in the Anson Knight house in Bradley, New York. This is one of the residences that had to be abandoned during the development of the Neversink reservoir, which flooded several former villages. It was developed to provide a water supply for New York City.

The Neversink and Delaware rivers are still known for fly fishing. John McDonald compiled Gordon's writing into the book The Complete Fly Fisherman: The Notes and Letters of Theodore Gordon (1947).

References

Gordon,Theodore
Gordon,Theodore
Angling writers
Burials at New York Marble Cemetery
People from Pittsburgh